The Bengal Foundation is a Bangladeshi non-profit and charitable organization headquartered in Dhanmondi, Dhaka. It is mostly known for organizing local and international events in the country.

History
Bengal Foundation was founded by Bangladeshi industrialist and entrepreneur Abul Khair Litu in 1986, as part of his endeavour to promote and showcase Bangladeshi art on a larger platform. The foundation was registered as a private trust and funded entirely by the Bengal Group. Since 1999, the foundation has organised several international art camps that involve nearly 300 artists from around the world. Notable venues include Florence (2005), Dhaka (2006), Kolkata (2008) and Maldives.

Projects

Films and documentaries
The Bengal Foundation produced and made films and documentaries, which are sorted below:

 Chobir Desher Chobi - Watercolour workshop
 Dhaka Art Camp 2006 - Dhaka Art Camp
 Portrait of an Alluvial Artist - A documentary about Kalidas Karmakar.
 Antarbikshan (Introspection) - A documentary about Swapan Chowdhury.
 Samay Khanan (Excavating Time) - A documentary about Dilara Begum Jolly.
 Jalgadhuli (Twilight Colours) - A documentary about Farida Zaman.
 Garaner Gahine - A documentary about Abdur Razzaque.

Bengal Publications
Bengal Publications is a publication center conducted and run by the Bengal Foundation.

Bengal Classical Music Festival

Goal
The Bengal Foundation has stated its goal is to develop, maintain and create a knowledge base goal for the highest quality of Bengali culture throughout the country and outside.

Android applications
Currently, four different android application is released by the foundation. Bengal eBoi:Bengali eBook Bank is for Bengali e-book collection. Kali o Kalam and ICE Today is for news and magazine.

References

External links
 
 Official android applications at Google Play

Foundations based in Bangladesh
1986 establishments in Bangladesh